From Illmatic to Stillmatic: The Remixes is an extended play by Nas. It includes six remixed versions of songs from the earlier Nas LPs Illmatic, It Was Written, and Stillmatic.  It was released by Columbia Records on July 2, 2002. It features AZ, R. Kelly and Foxy Brown.

Track listing

Notes
 From "Life's a Bitch" B-side (1994)
 From "One Love" B-side (1994)
 From "It Ain't Hard to Tell" B-side (1994)
 From "Street Dreams" (Remix) single (1996)
 From "Street Dreams" B-side (1996)
 Original track

Charts

References

2002 EPs
Albums produced by Large Professor
Albums produced by Trackmasters
Nas compilation albums
2002 remix albums
Remix EPs
Columbia Records remix albums
Columbia Records EPs
B-side compilation albums